Carl Pontus Gahn (1 March 1759 – 9 May 1825) was a Swedish military officer who participated in the Russo-Swedish War in Finland in 1788–1789, the Finnish War campaign in Norway in 1808 and the unsuccessful invasion of Norway at Eidskog in 1814. He was ennobled in 1809, taking the title Gahn af Colquhoun in acknowledgement of his Scottish ancestry (Gahn was itself a contraction via Cahun of the family name of Colquhoun). He was promoted to the rank of Major General in 1814 and became president of the Martial Court of Appeals (Krigshovrätten) in 1824.

References

1759 births
1825 deaths
People from Falun
Swedish Army major generals
Napoleonic Wars prisoners of war held by Norway
Swedish military personnel of the Napoleonic Wars